Mikhail Mikhailovich Zoshchenko (– 22 July 1958) was a Soviet and Russian writer and satirist.

Biography
Zoshchenko was born in 1894, in Saint Petersburg, Russia, according to his 1953 autobiography. His Ukrainian father was an artist and a mosaicist responsible for the exterior decoration of the Suvorov Museum in Saint Petersburg. His mother was Russian. The future writer attended the Faculty of Law at the Saint Petersburg University, but did not graduate due to financial problems. During World War I, Zoshchenko served in the army as a field officer, was wounded in action several times, and was heavily decorated. In 1919, during the Russian Civil War, he served for several months in the Red Army before being discharged for health reasons.
    
He was associated with the Serapion Brothers and attained particular popularity in the 1920s as a satirist, but, after his denunciation in the Zhdanov decree of 1946, Zoshchenko lived in dire poverty. He was awarded his pension only a few months before he died.   
   
Zoshchenko developed a simplified deadpan style of writing which simultaneously made him accessible to "the people" and mocked official demands for accessibility: "I write very compactly. My sentences are short. Accessible to the poor. Maybe that's the reason why I have so many readers." Volkov compares this style to the nakedness of the Russian holy fool or yurodivy.    
    
In 1940 Zoshchenko published a series of short stories for children about Vladimir Lenin.

Criticism
A critical anthology Мих. Зощенко: pro et contra, антология was published in 2015. It included a 1926 article by Iakov Moiseyevich Shafir.

Selected bibliography (in English translation)

A Man Is Not A Flea, trans. Serge Shishkoff, Ann Arbor, 1989.
Before Sunrise. Trans. Gary Kern, Ann Arbor, 1974.
Nervous People and Other Satires, ed. Hugh McLean, trans. Maria Gordon and Hugh McLean, London, 1963.
Scenes from the Bathhouse, trans. Sidney Monas, Ann Arbor, 1962.
Youth Restored. Trans. Joel Stern, Ann Arbor, 1984.
The Galosh. Trans. Jeremy Hicks, New York, 1996.
Sentimental Tales. Trans. Boris Dralyuk, New York, 2018.
Pассказы о Ленине ("Stories about Lenin". In Russian. Moscow, 1974.)

References

Further reading
Scatton, Linda Hart (1993). Mikhail Zoshchenko: Evolution of a Writer. Cambridge University Press. .

External links
Creative Commons English translation of Zoshchenko's ultra-short story Nervous People
Discovering Zoshchenko Alexander Melnikov, Russia Beyond the Headlines, 2 October 2009
English translation of Zoshchenko's short story Honest Citizen
Three short autobiographies by Zoshchenko 
Poverty | The Galosh by Zoshchenko at the Short Story Project
Mikhail Zoshchenko. Stories.

1894 births
1958 deaths
20th-century Russian male writers
20th-century Russian short story writers
People from Sankt-Peterburgsky Uyezd
Writers from Saint Petersburg
People of the Russian Civil War
Recipients of the Order of the Red Banner of Labour
Recipients of the Order of Saint Stanislaus (Russian), 2nd class
Recipients of the Order of Saint Stanislaus (Russian), 3rd class
Recipients of the Order of St. Anna, 3rd class
Recipients of the Order of St. Anna, 4th class
Recipients of the Order of St. Vladimir, 4th class
Russian people of Ukrainian descent
Russian Marxist writers
Russian military personnel of World War I
Russian-language writers
Soviet male writers
Soviet novelists
Soviet short story writers